Danspace Project is a performance venue for contemporary dance. Its performances are held in St. Mark's Church in the East Village area of the Manhattan borough of New York City.

History
Founded in 1974 by Barbara Dilley, Mary Overlie, and Larry Fagin to support the creation of new work in dance and performance. A fire damaged the church in 1978 and performances were temporarily held at the Third Street Music School.

Judy Hussie-Taylor became the Executive Director in 2008. In 2010, she launched the Platform series, which invites an artist to curate performances and events around a certain theme.

Danspace has shaped contemporary New York dance history presenting artists such as Ishmael Houston-Jones, Bill T. Jones, Trajal Harrell, Okwui Okpokwasili, and many others.

See also
Dance in the United States
List of theaters for dance

References 

Dance in New York City
Dance companies in the United States
Dance venues in the United States
Culture of New York City
Dance organizations
Performance art in New York City
1974 establishments in New York City